João Marcelo Messias Ferreira (born 13 June 2000) is a Brazilian footballer who plays for Portuguese club Porto.

Career statistics

Club

Honours
Porto
Supertaça Cândido de Oliveira: 2022

References

2000 births
Living people
Brazilian footballers
Brazilian expatriate footballers
Association football defenders
Boavista Sport Club players
Grêmio Foot-Ball Porto Alegrense players
Tombense Futebol Clube players
FC Porto players
FC Porto B players
Brazilian expatriate sportspeople in Portugal
Expatriate footballers in Portugal
Footballers from Rio de Janeiro (city)